Abibou Tchagnao (born 23 May 1975) is a retired Togolese football defender. He was a squad member for the 1998 and 2000 African Cup of Nations.

References

1975 births
Living people
Togolese footballers
Togo international footballers
FC Martigues players
FC Sète 34 players
FC Concordia Basel players
FC Wangen bei Olten players
FC Solothurn players
FC Alle players
SO Cassis Carnoux players
Association football defenders
Togolese expatriate footballers
Expatriate footballers in France
Togolese expatriate sportspeople in France
Expatriate footballers in Switzerland
Togolese expatriate sportspeople in Switzerland
Ligue 1 players
21st-century Togolese people